Marci Mustello is an American politician. She is a Republican representing the 11th district in the Pennsylvania House of Representatives.

Political career
Mustello worked as a staffer for Congressman Mike Kelly from 2011 to 2019.

In 2019, Mustello ran in a special election to represent District 11 in the Pennsylvania House of Representatives, after former representative Brian Ellis resigned over sexual assault allegations. She defeated Democrat Sam Doctor to win. In 2020, she defeated Ryan Covert in the Republican primary, and Sam Doctor again in the general election.

Committee assignments 

 Agriculture & rural affairs
 Human services
 Liquor control
 Transportation

Electoral record

References

Republican Party members of the Pennsylvania House of Representatives
Women state legislators in Pennsylvania
Living people
1970 births
21st-century American politicians
21st-century American women politicians